Yusuke Nishiyama may refer to:

, Japanese footballer
, Japanese long-distance runner